St Hugh's may refer to several institutions named after one of several Saint Hughs:
 St Hugh's College, Oxford, a college of the University of Oxford
 St Hugh's Hospital in Grimsby, North East Lincolnshire
 St Hugh's High School, Kingston, Jamaica, founded in 1899
 St Hugh's Preparatory School, Kingston, Jamaica
 St Hugh's School, Faringdon, Oxfordshire
 St Hugh's School, Woodhall Spa, Lincolnshire
 St Hugh's College, Tollerton, an independent secondary school in Nottinghamshire 
 St. Hilda's & St. Hugh's School, New York

"St Hugh's Hospital" is also the name of a fictional hospital in the UK procedural dramas The Bill and London's Burning.

See also
 St Hugh's Church (disambiguation)